Cricket Australia  (CA), formerly known as the Australian Cricket Board (ACB), is the governing body for professional and amateur cricket in Australia. It was originally formed in 1905 as the 'Australian Board of Control for International Cricket'. It is incorporated as an Australian Public Company, limited by guarantee.

Cricket Australia operates all of the Australian national representative cricket sides, including the Men's, the Women's and Youth sides. CA is also responsible for organising and hosting Test tours and one day internationals with other nations, and scheduling the home international fixtures.

Background
Cricket Australia is an administrative organisation responsible for cricket in Australia. Cricket Australia has six member organisations that represent each of the Australian states. These organisations are:

 New South Wales – Cricket NSW
 Queensland – Queensland Cricket
 South Australia – South Australian Cricket Association
 Tasmania – Cricket Tasmania
 Victoria – Cricket Victoria
 Western Australia – Western Australian Cricket
 Sunshine Coast - Sunshine Coast Cricket Association

Cricket ACT and Northern Territory Cricket are non-member associations, although the ACT participates in Cricket Australia tournaments such as the Women's National Cricket League and the Futures League, and previously briefly also competed in the domestic limited-overs competition.

Cricket Australia is governed by eight independent directors, who work collectively in the national interest of Australian cricket. The chief executive officer reports to the board of directors.

Each state cricket association that are members of Cricket Australia also selects a representative side to participate in Australia's major domestic cricket tournaments. This tournament occurs once every season.

Domestic teams, playing national tournaments

Cricket Australia also maintains a healthy but independent association with the Australian Cricketers' Association to provide proper player's rights and welfare requirements.

History
The first centralised authority for the administration of cricket in Australia was established in 1892 when representatives from the state associations of New South Wales, South Australia and Victoria came together to establish the Australasian Cricket Council. However the Australasian Cricket Council was disbanded in 1898, and what is now known as Cricket Australia was established in 1905 as the "Australian Board of Control for International Cricket". Before its establishment, tours by Australian teams to England were organised and funded by private groups or by the players themselves. Similarly, invitations to English teams were made by private promoters or by individual clubs, such as the Melbourne Cricket Club.  The Australasian Cricket Council's one lasting action was to establish the Sheffield Shield, the first-class cricket competition between the Australian colonies.

These early tours were lucrative for the players and promoters and cricket administrators looked to find ways to channel some of this money to the destitute clubs, through the state associations. Formal discussions began in January 1905 in Sydney for the formation of a body to take control of tours from the players. A draft constitution was discussed by members of the New South Wales, Victoria, South Australian and Queensland associations. The first meeting of the new board was held at Wesley College in Melbourne on 6 May 1905.

The foundation members were the New South Wales Cricket Association and the Victorian Cricket Association. South Australia's delegates refused to join the Board because the Board structure denied the players any representation. The Queensland Cricket Association was represented as an observer only.

Queensland did decide to formally join the association with one delegate member the following year, and the constitution was amended in 1906, so that New South Wales, South Australia and Victoria would each have three permanent representatives, and Queensland one representative. In 1907 Tasmania was permitted to send a single representative, and Western Australia did likewise in 1913. Changes to this structure were made in 1914 and 1974 respectively when Queensland and Western Australia formally increased their representation to two each.

As a result of the strict border policies introduced by the Australian government due to the Coronavirus epidemic, Cricket Australia effectively withdrew its team from Test match competition from February to November 2021. During this period England and India played 11 Test matches and Pakistan and the West Indies each played 8 Tests. The Australian Test team resumed international competition at the Gabba on December 8 against England.

Name changes
Cricket Australia has had three different names since its foundation. They are:

Australian Board of Control for International Cricket (1905–1973)
Australian Cricket Board (1973–2003)
Cricket Australia (2003–present)

Finances
The organisation's revenue was A$380.9 million in the year ended 30 June 2015, with a net surplus of $99 million largely attributed to the success of co-hosting the 2015 ICC Cricket World Cup.

Competitions
As well as responsibility for Australian international sides, Cricket Australia organises interstate cricket in Australia, including the three premier competitions in each of the major forms of the game. These are the Sheffield Shield in first-class cricket, the JLT One-Day Cup, which is the domestic one-day competition, and the KFC Big Bash League, which is the domestic Twenty20 competition.

Cricket Australia's competitions:

 Sheffield Shield
 Marsh One-Day Cup
 Big Bash League
 Futures League (Second XI)
 Women's National Cricket League
 Women's Big Bash League

Cricket Australia also runs the Under 19 and Under 17 Male Championships, the Under 18 and Under 15 Female National Championships, the National Indigenous Cricket Championships and the National Cricket Inclusion Championships.

Honours
Cricket Australia also provides awards for various categories of players, including:
 Male: Test Player of the Year, One-Day Player of the Year, Bradman Young Player of the Year, Domestic Player of the Year, and the Allan Border Medal for the overall best Australian men's cricketer of the year. 
 Female: the Belinda Clark Award for the best Australian women's cricketer of the year, the Betty Wilson Young Player of the Year, and the Domestic Player of the Year 

Cricket Australia also honours players for exceptional service to the game of cricket in Australia by annually adding former players of great distinction to the Australian Cricket Hall of Fame.

Principals / Chairman of Cricket Australia

Chairmen
 Richard Teece: 1892–1893
 Richard Best:	1893–1895
 Mostyn Evan:	1895–1896; 1910–1911
 John Gibson:	1896–1897
 Will Whitridge:	1897–1900
 Lawrence Adamson:	1905–1906
 Ernie Bean:	1906–1907; 1912–1913
 George Barbour:	1907–1908
 George Foxton:	1908–1910
 Charles Eady:	1911
 William McElhone:	1911–1912
 James Allen:	1913–1914
 Harry Blinman:	1914–1919
 Harold Bushby: 1919; 1925–1926
 Harry Gregory:	1919–1920; 1922–1923; 1926–1927
 Harry Rush:	1920–1922
 Jack Hutcheon:	1923–1924
 Bernard Scrymgour:	1924–1925
 Aubrey Oxlade:	1927–1930; 1933–1936; 1945–1948; 1951–1952
 Dr Allen Robertson:	1930–1933; 1936–1945; 1948–1951
 Roy Middleton:	1952–1955
 Frank Cush:	1955–1957
 Bill Dowling:	1957–1960
 Sir Donald Bradman:	1960–1963; 1969–1972
 Ewart Macmillan:	1963–1966
 Bob Parish:	1966–1969; 1975–1978
 Tim Caldwell:	1972–1975
 Phil Ridings:	1980–1983
 Fred Bennett:	1983–1986
 Malcolm Gray:	1986–1989
 Colin Egar:	1989–1992
 Alan Crompton:	1992–1995
 Denis Rogers:	1995–2001
 Robert Merriman:	2001–2005
 Creagh O'Connor:	2005–2008
 Jack Clarke: 2008–2011
 Wally Edwards: 2011–2015
 David Peever: 2015–2018
 Earl Eddings: 2018–2021
 Richard Freudenstein: 2021–2022 (interim)
 Dr Lachlan Henderson: 2022–present
 Mike Baird: 2023– (incoming)

Secretaries & Chief Executive Officers
 John Portus:	1892–1896
 John Creswell:	1896–1900
 William McElhone:	1905–1910
 Colin Sinclair:	1910–1911
 Sydney Smith:	1911–1927
 William Jeanes:	1927–1954
 Jack Ledward:	1954–1960
 Alan Barnes:	1960–1980
 David Richards:	1980–1993
 Graham Halbish:	1993–1997
 Malcolm Speed:	1997–2001
 James Sutherland:	2001–2018
 Kevin Roberts:	2018–2020
 Nick Hockley:	2020–present

National Selection Panel

The National Selection Panel is the part of Cricket Australia responsible for team selections for each of the Australian national sides in every form of cricket.

The current three-man panel for the Australian men's sides is: George Bailey (chairman), Andrew McDonald (head coach) and Tony Dodemaide.

The current four-person panel for the Australia women's sides is: Shawn Flegler (chairman), Matthew Mott (head coach), Avril Fahey and Julie Hayes.

Board of directors
Cricket Australia is governed by nine directors, who work collectively in the national interest of Australian cricket.

The chief executive officer reports to the board of nine directors. The current nine board members are:

Last updated: 13 October 2022

See also

 Australian national cricket team
 Australia national women's cricket team
 Cricket in Australia

References

Bibliography
 Wisden Cricketers Almanack

External links
 Cricket Australia official website
 Cricket news, scores and highlights produced by Cricket Australia's digital content team
 Official CA Facebook page
 Cricket Feature – Daily Telegraph

Australia

1905 establishments in Australia
Sports organizations established in 1905